Marionana is a genus of snout moths described by Pierre Viette in 1953.

Species
 Marionana paulianalis Viette, 1953

Former species
 Marionana vinolentalis Viette, 1960

References

Pyralinae
Pyralidae genera